The 1983 San Francisco mayoral recall election was held on April 26, 1983 to determine whether mayor Dianne Feinstein should be removed from office. The recall measure was overwhelmingly defeated, and Feinstein remained in office.

Background
In 1983, Feinstein passed a handgun ban (later overturned by the state court of appeals). This angered the White Panther Party, who then organized a successful effort to force a recall election against Feinstein. The White Panther Party's efforts to collect signature were aided by recent anger (particularly in the city's gay community) over Feinstein's veto of legislation which would have extended city-employee benefits to domestic partners.

Campaign
Feinstein was considered to be a popular mayor. By the time of election day, Feinstein's victory was seen as a foregone conclusion.

Feinstein's campaign had organized a very successful effort to encourage voters to use absentee ballots, and distributed absentee ballots to voters ahead of the election.

Despite some disapproval of Feinstein among the gay community, they did not heavily support recalling Feinstein.

Results
Feinstein only lost a single precinct out of the city's 710 voting precincts. The precinct she failed to win (which was the home district of the White Panther Party which had organized the effort to recall Feinstein) saw her lose by only a single vote.

References

San Francisco mayoral recall
Mayoral elections in San Francisco
San Francisco
Recall
San Francisco 1983